Vilius Šapoka (born 14 December 1978) is a former Minister of Finance in Republic of Lithuania and Governor of the European Investment Bank for the Republic of Lithuania.

Education
Šapoka obtained the degree of Master of Economics in Banking at Vilnius University and has an International Executive MBA from the Baltic Management Institute.

Career
Šapoka started his professional career at the Lithuanian Savings Bank in 1999. From 2006 to 2012 he worked at the Lithuanian Securities Commission, first as Commissioner, then Vice-Chairman, and finally Chairman. Šapoka was employed at the Lithuanian Ministry of Finance from 2002 to 2006 in the Market Policy Department.

From 2012 to 2016 Šapoka was Financial Services and Markets Department Director at the Bank of Lithuania.
 
Šapoka served as Minister of Finance of Lithuania from 13 December 2016 to 7 December 2020.

Political positions
At the beginning of his term, Šapoka announced that the government's goal was to raise tax revenues to 40 percent of gross domestic product (GDP) within five years from 30 percent, to help improve education and healthcare.

Other activities
 European Bank for Reconstruction and Development (EBRD), Ex-Officio Member of the Board of Governors
 European Stability Mechanism (ESM), Member of the Board of Governors (since 2016)
 International Monetary Fund (IMF), Ex-Officio Alternate Member of the Board of Governors
 Multilateral Investment Guarantee Agency (MIGA), World Bank Group, Ex-Officio Member of the Board of Governors
 Nordic Investment Bank (NIB), Ex-Officio Member of the Board of Governors (since 2016)
 World Bank, Ex-Officio Member of the Board of Governors

References

21st-century Lithuanian politicians
1970 births
Lithuanian people of Russian descent
Living people
Ministers of Finance of Lithuania
People from Šiauliai
Politicians from Šiauliai